Rawene is a town on the south side of the Hokianga harbour, in Northland, New Zealand. State Highway 12 passes to the south. The town lies at the apex of a peninsula. A car ferry links it to Kohukohu and the northern Hokianga.

History

Rawene started as a timber centre, with a mill and shipyards established in the early 19th century. An attempted settlement by the first New Zealand Company in 1826 failed. Captain James Herd in 1822 had taken out the first shipment of kauri from the Hokianga in his ship Providence. In 1825 he returned as an agent for the Company, sailing the Rosanna in company with the Lambton,
and 60 settlers between the two vessels. Starting at Stewart Island/Rakiura, Herd sailed up the east coast eventually rounding North Cape to enter Hokianga - his old stamping ground. Herd negotiated to buy a vast tract of land. The deal was contested but for decades Europeans referred to the town as "Herd's Point". Later it was called "Hokianga Township", and in 1884 it became "Rawene", possibly to identify the post office and telegraph.

The post office had started operating by 1845 - one of eight in the country.

Aperahama Taonui, chief of Te Popoto hapū, allegedly operated a school at Rawene in the mid-19th century.

James Reddy Clendon, previously the United States Consul to New Zealand, settled in Rawene in 1862 and served as the local magistrate under the Native Circuit Courts Act until 1867. His house still stands and is open to the public.

By 1872 Rawene had two hotels and two stores. There was a Wesleyan church, and the Roman Catholics owned a section. Von Sturmer was the Postmaster, Customs Officer and Magistrate.

During the Dog Tax War of 1898 the residents of Rawene left for Kohukohu or took refuge on a steamer after the tax rebels threatened to march on the town. On 5 May 1898 120 men marched from Rawene to Waima to deal with the "rebels", but the dispute was settled without them.

A small cottage hospital was built on a hill overlooking the town in 1910. A new hospital was completed in 1928. Dr George McCall Smith headed the hospital from 1914 to 1948 and developed a unique health-system for the Hokianga.

Dr Smith became a practitioner of "painless childbirth" in the early 1930s, using premedication with the barbiturate Nembutal combined with Hyoscine. This proved very popular and attracted women to Rawene from far afield. The annual average of thirty births per year now peaked at two hundred. In 1937 a "Commission of Inquiry into Maternity Services" investigated Smith's practice. Smith fronted up with case notes on his last two hundred patients, and his results could not be bettered anywhere.

Parliament declared a special health area in the 1940s. This meant that all medical officers in the Hokianga were salaried, and all consultations, pharmaceuticals, investigations and hospital admissions were free. The whole scheme was funded through a per-capita grant.

Demographics
Statistics New Zealand describes Rawene as a rural settlement. The settlement is part of the larger Hokianga South statistical area.

Rawene had a population of 498 at the 2018 New Zealand census, an increase of 27 people (5.7%) since the 2013 census, and an increase of 57 people (12.9%) since the 2006 census. There were 189 households, comprising 246 males and 246 females, giving a sex ratio of 1.0 males per female, with 96 people (19.3%) aged under 15 years, 63 (12.7%) aged 15 to 29, 201 (40.4%) aged 30 to 64, and 132 (26.5%) aged 65 or older.

Ethnicities were 54.8% European/Pākehā, 60.8% Māori, 8.4% Pacific peoples, 1.2% Asian, and 1.2% other ethnicities. People may identify with more than one ethnicity.

Although some people chose not to answer the census's question about religious affiliation, 47.6% had no religion, 39.2% were Christian, 4.2% had Māori religious beliefs, and 0.6% were Buddhist.

Of those at least 15 years old, 66 (16.4%) people had a bachelor's or higher degree, and 78 (19.4%) people had no formal qualifications. 27 people (6.7%) earned over $70,000 compared to 17.2% nationally. The employment status of those at least 15 was that 102 (25.4%) people were employed full-time, 63 (15.7%) were part-time, and 33 (8.2%) were unemployed.

Hokianga South statistical area

Hokianga South had a population of 1,236 at the 2018 New Zealand census, a decrease of 3 people (−0.2%) since the 2013 census, and an increase of 171 people (16.1%) since the 2006 census. There were 444 households, comprising 612 males and 624 females, giving a sex ratio of 0.98 males per female. The median age was 46.2 years (compared with 37.4 years nationally), with 270 people (21.8%) aged under 15 years, 162 (13.1%) aged 15 to 29, 531 (43.0%) aged 30 to 64, and 273 (22.1%) aged 65 or older.

Ethnicities were 52.4% European/Pākehā, 63.1% Māori, 6.3% Pacific peoples, 1.5% Asian, and 1.5% other ethnicities. People may identify with more than one ethnicity.

The percentage of people born overseas was 10.4, compared with 27.1% nationally.

Although some people chose not to answer the census's question about religious affiliation, 42.7% had no religion, 41.5% were Christian, 6.3% had Māori religious beliefs, 0.2% were Muslim, 0.2% were Buddhist and 1.5% had other religions.

Of those at least 15 years old, 129 (13.4%) people had a bachelor's or higher degree, and 198 (20.5%) people had no formal qualifications. The median income was $18,700, compared with $31,800 nationally. 66 people (6.8%) earned over $70,000 compared to 17.2% nationally. The employment status of those at least 15 was that 288 (29.8%) people were employed full-time, 162 (16.8%) were part-time, and 66 (6.8%) were unemployed.

Education
Rawene School is a coeducational full primary (years 1-8) school has a roll of  students as of 

A room for secondary students was added to Rawene Primary School in 1922. In 1947 a stand-alone Rawene District High School was built. It was extended in 1952, but was destroyed by fire in 1972.

The Rawene Learning Centre is a campus of NorthTec polytechnic.

Notable people
Norm Maxwell, rugby union footballer and All Black.
Ron Guthrey, mayor of Christchurch (1968 to 1971).
Gordon Cochrane, WWII RNZAF bomber pilot.
René Shadbolt, nurse in Spanish Civil War, Hokianga hospital matron
George McCall Smith, doctor, medical superintendent, community leader

References

External links

Rawene - Hokianga's Picturesque Port Town
rawene.nz

Far North District
Hokianga
Populated places in the Northland Region